Erik van der Wurff (9 July 1945 – 22 September 2014) was a Dutch pianist, composer, arranger, producer and conductor. He worked mainly on soundtracks and as a composer for many movies and television shows. He also made acting appearances in two Dutch-German television shows in 1977 and 1980. He was the regular pianist and composer on the Herman van Veen shows. He composed music for many theater productions, musicals, movies and for the comic series Alfred Jodokus Kwak which was aired in various countries.

Van der Wurff was born in De Bilt, Utrecht. In 2009, he was given the Order of the Netherlands Lion.

Van der Wurff died from leukemia on 22 September 2014 in Soest, Netherlands, aged 69.

References

Other websites

 

1945 births
2014 deaths
Deaths from cancer in the Netherlands
Dutch composers
Dutch conductors (music)
Male conductors (music)
Dutch pianists
Dutch record producers
20th-century pianists
People from De Bilt
Knights of the Order of the Netherlands Lion
20th-century conductors (music)
20th-century Dutch male musicians